Rebecca Cremer (April 3, 1924 – April 20, 2006) was an American alpine skier. She competed in two events at the 1948 Winter Olympics.

References

External links
 

1924 births
2006 deaths
American female alpine skiers
Olympic alpine skiers of the United States
Alpine skiers at the 1948 Winter Olympics
People from Woodstock, Vermont
Sportspeople from Vermont
20th-century American women
21st-century American women